Calpulalpan officially as Heroic City of Calpulalpan, is a mexican city, head and main urban center of the homonymous municipality, located to the west of the state of Tlaxcala. With 33 263 inhabitants in 2010 according to the population and housing census conducted by the National Institute of Statistics and Geography (INEGI), is the sixth most populous city in the state. It has an estimated population of 37,752 inhabitants for 2017, according to the National Population Council (CONAPO).

Sister cities
  Pahuatlán, México

References

External links
Link to tables of population data from Census of 2005 INEGI: Instituto Nacional de Estadística, Geografía e Informática

Populated places in Tlaxcala